The 1953–54 season was the 81st season of competitive football in Scotland and the 57th season of the Scottish Football League.

Scottish League Division A

Champions: Celtic
Relegated: Airdrieonians, Hamilton Academical

Scottish League Division B

Promoted: Motherwell, Kilmarnock
Relegated: Dumbarton

Scottish League Division C

Promoted: Brechin City

Cup honours

Other Honours

County

 * - aggregate over two legs

Highland League

Scotland national team

Scotland qualified for their first ever World Cup in 1954 which was held in Switzerland.

Key:
 (H) = Home match
 (A) = Away match
 BHC = British Home Championship
 WCQG3 = World Cup qualifying – Group 3
 WCG3 = World Cup – Group 3

Notes and references

External links
Scottish Football Historical Archive

 
Seasons in Scottish football